Trinity College Nabbingo (TRICONA), is an all-girls boarding school covering grades 8–13 in Central Uganda.

Location

History
TRICONA was founded in 1942 by the White Fathers, who are affiliated with the Roman Catholic Church. Thirty six years earlier, the same religious congregation had founded St. Mary's College Kisubi, a boys-only residential middle and high school along the Kampala-Entebbe Road. TRICONA was established, having realized that the secondary education of Catholic girls needed to be addressed as well. The objectives were to produce educated women who are "morally upright", "academically sound", "socially and physically capable" of serving God and their country. In the beginning, the school's administration was overseen by the Missionary Sisters of Our Lady of Africa (White Sisters), who later, in 1960 handed it over to the Canonesses Sisters of St. Augustine.

Notable alumni

Some of the notable women who have attended Trinity College Nabbingo include the following: 
 Dominica Dipio -  Religious sister, filmmaker, author and a professor of Literature and Film at Makerere University.
 Hope Mwesigye – A former Minister for Agriculture, Animal Industry and Fisheries in Uganda, 2009 -2011.
 Jacqueline Mbabazi – Educator and politician. Wife of former prime minister Amama Mbabazi and chairperson of the National Resistance Movement Women's League.
 Joanita Kawalya – A composer and vocalist with the Afrigo Band.
 Judith Tukahirwa – Environmental scientist, water and sanitation consultant, and management executive. As of December 2012, she was the deputy executive director of the Kampala Capital City Authority.
 Laeticia Kikonyogo – Deputy chief justice of Uganda, 2003 – 2010.
 Margaret Nakatudde Nsereko – Educator and administrator. First Ugandan lay person to become headmistress at the school. Served in that capacity from 1971 until 1987.
 Bernadette Olowo – first woman accepted as ambassador to the Holy See in over 900 years at her appointment in 1975.
 Mary Karoro Okurut – Cabinet Minister for General Duties in the Office of the Prime Minister, beginning in 2016. She also serves as the elected Woman Member of Parliament for Bushenyi District, 2005 – 2021
 Namirembe Bitamazire – A former Minister of Education in Uganda, 2005 – 2011.
 Syda Bbumba – A former Minister of Gender and Social Issues in Uganda, 2011 – 2012.
Maria Musoke - an Information Scientist and academic. First Uganda female to acquire a PhD in Information Science. Deputy Vice Chancellor in charge of Academic and Affairs at Kyambogo University, May 2018 - May 2023.

See also
Education in Uganda
Cyprian Kizito Lwanga
Roman Catholic Archdiocese of Kampala
Roman Catholicism in Uganda
St. Mary's College Kisubi

References

External links
Home Page
Holy Cross Family Ministries East Africa Retreats With Trinity College Nabbingo

Schools in Uganda
Boarding schools in Uganda
1942 establishments in Uganda
Girls' schools in Uganda
White Fathers
Catholic universities and colleges in Africa
Educational institutions established in 1942
Wakiso District